The Oslo Agreements or Convention of Economic Rapprochement of 22 December 1930 were an economic agreement between the countries which had already agreed upon the Dutch-Scandinavian Economic Pact (Netherlands, Denmark, Norway, and Sweden) earlier that year and the countries of the BLEU, Belgium and Luxembourg. Finland would join the agreement in 1933.

The countries promised not to raise tariffs between them without first notifying and consulting the other signatory powers. As with the Dutch-Scandinavian Economic Pact, the Oslo Agreements were one of the regional responses to the Great Depression.

See also
 Ouchy Convention

Sources
 Nordic Trade Policy in the 1930s
 Declaration of 1 July 1938 (end of the agreement)
 
 
 

Treaties of Belgium
Treaties of Luxembourg
Treaties of Denmark
Treaties of Norway
Treaties of Sweden
Free trade agreements
1930 in Denmark
1930 in Luxembourg
Interwar-period treaties
Treaties concluded in 1930
Treaties of the Netherlands
Treaties of Finland